Tendukheda Assembly constituency is one of the 230 Vidhan Sabha (Legislative Assembly) constituencies of Madhya Pradesh state in central India.

It is part of Narsinghpur District.

References

Assembly constituencies of Madhya Pradesh